Merlin J. "Mickey" Marty (February 24, 1922 – March 8, 2013) was an American basketball player. He played college basketball at Loras College in Dubuque, Iowa, where in 1948 he was an All-American.

Marty played prep basketball at Loras Academy and in 1939 led the team to the Iowa Catholic School championship. He enrolled at hometown Loras College and played the 1940–41 season for the Duhawks. His college experience was interrupted as he served in the United States Marine Corps during World War II. He would then re-enroll at Loras for the 1945–46 season after a three-year absence. In the 1946–47 season, he led the team to a 24–5 team and a spot in the 1947 NAIA men's basketball tournament. In his final season with the Duhawks, Marty averaged 18.5 points per game and led the team to a 23–8 record, setting three Iowa Conference scoring records. At the close of the season, he was named a second-team All-American by Converse, making him the first player from a small college to be named to a major All-American team.

Following the close of his college career, Marty was drafted by the Chicago Stags in the 1948 BAA draft but turned down an offer to play for the team to move into coaching and focus on his young family. He coached high school basketball at St. Joseph's Academy in Mason City, Iowa, and later in Wisconsin. He then refereed high school basketball games for a time before turning to managing recreational bowling centers.

Marty died on March 8, 2013, in Galesburg, Illinois, at age 91.

References

External links
Loras Athletic Hall of Fame profile

1922 births
2013 deaths
All-American college men's basketball players
American men's basketball coaches
American men's basketball players
Basketball coaches from Iowa
Basketball players from Iowa
Forwards (basketball)
High school basketball coaches in Iowa
High school basketball coaches in Wisconsin
Loras Duhawks men's basketball players
Sportspeople from Dubuque, Iowa
United States Marine Corps personnel of World War II